Joel D. Dykstra (born February 13, 1958) is an American businessman and politician who served as a Republican member of the South Dakota House of Representatives, who represented the 16th District from 2003 to 2009. His district included Lincoln and Union counties.

In 1980 Dykstra graduated from Oral Roberts University in Tulsa, Oklahoma with a degree in Business Management. Dykstra has three daughters and one granddaughter. He and his family lived in Europe for nine years while Dykstra worked for Lasmo Energy.

In 2007, Dykstra announced his candidacy for United States Senate, vying for the seat then held by incumbent Senator Tim Johnson (D). Dykstra was defeated on November 4, 2008, when Senator Johnson held onto his Senate seat by a margin of approximately 62.5% to 37.5%.

See also
2008 United States Senate election in South Dakota

Notes

External links
 Joel Dykstra for U.S. Senate - Former Campaign website
 South Dakota Legislature - Representative Joel D. Dykstra official SD House website
 Project Vote Smart - Representative Joel D. Dykstra (SD) profile
 Follow the Money - Joel D Dykstra
 2006 2004 2002 campaign contributions

 Profile at SourceWatch

Republican Party members of the South Dakota House of Representatives
1958 births
Living people
People from Canton, South Dakota
Oral Roberts University alumni